Hurtsmile is the first studio album of Boston hard rock band Hurtsmile.

Track listing
All songs written by Gary & Mark Cherone unless noted.

"Just War Theory" – 2:41
"Stillborn" – 3:51
"Love Thy Neighbor" – 3:42
"Kaffur (Infidel)" – 4:28
"Painter Paint" – 2:30
"Tolerance Song" – 3:23
"Set Me Free" – 4:18
"Jesus Would You Meet Me" – 3:15
"Slave" – 5:18
"Beyond the Garden / Kicking Against the Goads" – 6:25
"Just War Reprise" – 4:19 (Gary Cherone)
"The Murder of Daniel Faulkner (4699)" – 5:34 (Gary Cherone)

Personnel
 Gary Cherone – vocals
 Mark Cherone - guitars
 Joe Pessia - bass, mandolin
 Dana Spellman - drums, percussion

Other personnel
 Jeff Calder - keyboards

2011 debut albums